Urša Bežan (born 24 May 1994 in Kranj) is a Slovenian swimmer. She competed in the 4 × 200 metre freestyle relay event at the 2012 Summer Olympics.

References

Slovenian female swimmers
1994 births
Olympic swimmers of Slovenia
Swimmers at the 2012 Summer Olympics
Living people
Sportspeople from Kranj
European Aquatics Championships medalists in swimming
Slovenian female freestyle swimmers